Rogelio de Jesus Miret (born June 30, 1964) is a Cuban American musician. He is the vocalist for New York hardcore band Agnostic Front, street punk group Roger Miret and the Disasters, and hardcore band The Alligators.

Agnostic Front are considered to be "the godfathers of hardcore" and one of the bands that created the New York scene.

Personal life 
Miret was born in Havana, Cuba. He is the older half-brother of Madball frontman Freddy Cricien. The two have the same mother, who is of Cuban descent, and different fathers, hence the different last names. Miret and his family fled Cuba to escape the Castro regime. They came to the United States in 1968 and settled in New York.

Miret was incarcerated on a drug charge in the late 1980s, spending almost two years in jail. In a 2011 interview, he stated that he became involved in it because he was living in poverty, squatting buildings, and his then-partner was pregnant. After being released, he started supporting PETA campaigns, as well as other non-profit organizations, and followed a vegetarian diet for many years.

Nowadays, he does not smoke and does not use recreational drugs, except for an occasional drink.

In September 2021, Miret revealed that he was diagnosed with cancer earlier in 2021. (He also has a heart condition which is constantly monitored by his physician, via a pacemaker fitted in 2022). However, after a lengthy hospital stay and surgery, the cancer is now in remission. A GoFundMe page was launched to help Miret pay for his medical bills.

Other projects

In 2012, Onno Cro-Mag (real name: Onno van Ravensteijn; d. 2013) from Aardschok magazine of the Netherlands and Miret started the hardcore music record label Strength Records.

With Jon Wiederhorn, Miret released My Riot: Agnostic Front, Grit, Guts & Glory in August 2017. The autobiography chronicles Miret's career as the vocalist of Agnostic Front as well as his upbringing; it focuses on Miret's trials and tribulations growing up in 1980s New York City.

Prior to joining Agnostic Front, Miret played bass for The Psychos, who claimed in a 1984 interview that Miret was replaced due to the fact that Miret became "more devoted" to Agnostic Front and therefore "couldn't make rehearsals and so forth."

Discography

With Agnostic Front
 United Blood  (1983)
 Victim in Pain (1984)
 Cause for Alarm (1986)
 Liberty and Justice For... (1987)
 Live at CBGB (1989)
 One Voice (1992)
 Last Warning (1993)
 Something's Gotta Give (1998)
 Riot, Riot, Upstart (1999)
 Dead Yuppies (2001)
 Another Voice (2004)
 Warriors (2007)
 My Life My Way (2011)
 The American Dream Died (2015)
 Get Loud! (2019)

With Roger Miret and the Disasters
 Roger Miret and the Disasters (2002)
 1984 (2005)
 My Riot (2006)
 Gotta Get Up Now (2011)

The Alligators
 You Ruined Everything (2006)
 The Alligators (2008)
 Time's Up, You're Dead (2012)

References

External links

Official Agnostic Front website (archived)

1964 births
Living people
American male singers
American punk rock singers
American heavy metal singers
Cuban people of Catalan descent
American people of Cuban descent
Hardcore punk musicians
Madball members
20th-century squatters
Agnostic Front members